Pasquel Wasam Ananda Keerthirathna (born January 29, 1956), known professionally as Keerthi Pasquel (Sinhala: කීර්ති පැස්කුවල්:) is a veteran pop musician and composer from Kandy, Sri Lanka. He has been performing for more than three decades and has won a number of awards. Keerthi is a judge on the National reality show ‘Derana Dream Star’ and sets the record as the only judge in Sri Lanka to sit for 10 consecutive seasons in a reality show beginning from 2008 until today. He has been active in music education and in social welfare.

Early life 
Keerthi Pasquel was born in the city of Hanthana, Kandy as the youngest of four older siblings. His parents were S. W. Leslin and Pasquel Wasam Gayaneris. His older siblings are Nalini, Rukmani Chandra, Padmasiri and Chitrani. Keerthi studied at Dharmaraja College up until his GCE O/level examination. Keerthi's passion for music was greatly influenced by his family where he grew up amidst soothing music all around his home. The melodious singing prowess of his mother was a huge influence on Keerthi. His father could play the harmonium. Keerthi was just ten years old when his father developed an illness and eventually passed away, eventually leaving his mother to shoulder the responsibility of five children as well as taking over her husband's business. Keerthi's mother's dream was to make him a doctor but he started to follow a course on lathe machinery at the Technical College, after his O Levels.

His brother Padmasiri Pasquel was the first member of the family to bring a guitar to their home. He had joined a group called ‘Halians’ where he played the lead guitar. But Padmasiri never allowed Keerthi to touch the instrument, because he feared the boy might neglect studies if he focused on music. He had three cousin brothers – Bandula, Lalith and Ranjith, who frequently patronized their home to learn the guitar from Padmasiri. So Keerthi started learning about guitar chords from Bandula, on the sly. Gradually, Keerthi learnt the guitar secretly. He took part in school concerts as he could sing well.

When he was in Grade 9, the school had a talent contest and Keerthi was the obvious choice in the singing segment. He even trained the final ten students with whom he himself competed. The grand finale was held at the Kandy Buddhist Centre. Keerthi sang Victor Rathnayake's ‘Adawan Desin’. Unfortunately for him, the music orchestra backing him gave a low tempo and the song finally ended up like a poem. All his hopes of winning the contest were smashed. The guys whom he taught overtook him. But he never gave up.

Having learnt the guitar from Bandula, Keerthi and a few teenage friends formed a small musical group which played at functions but was never paid. One day, Keerthi's group was invited to perform at a wedding. Riyaldeen, having heard about Keerthi's exceptional skills, invited him to join a group headed by Stanley Peiris as a bass guitarist. The band was named ‘GALAXIES’.

When  Keerthi was attending the technical course, he tried to join the Army band and went for interviews too. He was called for training during this period. But when he told this to Stanley Peiris, he had asked him to remain in the band as the bass guitarist.

Career 

As time went on, Keerthi became a permanent member of the 'Galaxies'. Though Keerthi played the bass guitar, at these recordings he was given small percussion instruments like maracas, clappers, triangle and bells. Keerthi was invited by Gretian Ananda to play the bass guitar for four new songs he was planning to record. Rookantha to be on the keyboard, Sarath Wickrema the accordion and Mahinda Bandara was slotted for the lead. The first milestone song was ‘ Etha Duraka Desa Pawela’.

Later on, Keerthi befriended Thilak Dias who had a unique playing style with the guitar with a gifted knack of playing it with his fingers giving an exceptional output. Since then Keerthi, being intrigued by Thilak's style, also used this finger style on the bass guitar for all his recordings and he started getting more recordings as a bass guitarist. In addition to Stanley Peiris, Keerthi was fortunate to get work in the recordings of Sarath Dassanayake, Rohana Weerasinghe and other veterans of the time. He was invited to join Patrick Denipitiya's Combo as a bass guitarist and vocalist singing songs of Clarence Wijewardana, Amaradewa, Nihal Nelson, Neville Fernando, Nanda Malini, Rukmani Devi and a host of others. This, he did even with Galaxies. Keerthi always believes that his present vocal prowess is blessed with a blend of all such great singers. He played as the bass guitar for Mount Chimes too.

As his brother Padmasiri returned to the country in 1982, they formed a band called ‘Colour Lite’ with Mahinda, Padmasiri, Gamini Perera and Ranjith Silva.It is during this time that Visharada Nanda Malini had been on the lookout for a male chorus singer. She had asked Stanley if he could recommend somebody. Stanley had suggested Keerthi's name. This resulted in a memorable chapter in Keerthi's musical career. From 1982 to 1985 he was a chorus singer and bass guitarist in Nanda Malini's Sathyaye Geethaya, contributing for 530 concerts. That was an era when they had four shows every weekend. Sathyaye Geethaya was virtually an institution for Keerthi who learnt how to work methodically and organize things systematically.

In the meantime, Keerthi also played for Lata Rathriya, Baig Geethika and concerts of Freddie Silva and Jothi Rathriya of H. R. Jothipala. In 1981, Keerthi helped his friend Sunil Dharmasena produce a cassette where Keerthi too contributed one of his songs, ‘Hanthane Nil Kanduweti Athare’ to the cassette. It went down on record as Keerthi's first cassette song too.

This unexpected turn of events, made Keerthi ambitious to do his own songs. This was the era when a cassette revolution was emerging in the country and Keerthi and his teammates were busy with recordings. Song recordings at Bishop's House Joe Neth Studio had to cease by 10 pm. When there were days they finished off around 8.30 pm, the intervening time was used to record songs for Keerthi. An orchestra guy would make a melody and Keerthi would sing. Creations like Oba Ma Hamu Wu, Neela Ahase and Kavikaraye were songs that came as a result of such instant recordings done during the gaps.

By then Keerthi had a collection of ten of his own songs. Keerthi used to play for ITN's popular Madu Rasanga segment presented by veterans Ariyasiri Vithanage and Indunil Dissanayake. PLA Somapala was the producer. Generally, for Madu Rasanga, the original artistes and musicians mimed for the original tracks, but it was done skillfully.

During one such recording in 1983, the original artiste had not turned up on time and the musicians had to idle for some time. The boys in the technical team, knowing Keerthi had some songs of his own suggested that Keerthi recorded one of his songs for Madu Rasanga. The boys enthusiastically did the recording ‘Neela Ahase Sende Walaa’, in the absence of producer PLA Somapala. In 1984, much to Keerthi's surprise, this song was telecast on ITN's Madu Rasanga and it became an overnight hit. That was Keerthi's biggest turning point in his tuneful career and was followed up with another hit song ‘Sinhala Raja Kaale’.

During the Nitin Mukesh concert at the Galle Face Green in 1985, Keerthi was an orchestra member. Suddenly Rajini Selvanayagam came up to them with a sheet of paper and wanted someone to do a nice Kaffirinna melody for the words ‘Sinhala Raja Kaale Newei’ since her troupe had a dance item lined up during the concert. Ranjith Perera instantly made a tune while Gretian, Mervyn Perera, Mahinda and Keerthi were slotted to sing it. But on the day of the show, there was only one microphone before Keerthi. TNL's Shan Wickremesinghe did the video recording and it had picked only Keerthi's voice. So, it automatically became Keerthi's song later on. Keerthi's maiden solo musical concert ‘Keerthi Gee Sankalpana’ was held on January 28, 1988, followed by another performance the following day at the Lumbini Theatre, bringing him incredible feedback from his fans. But circumstances led him to leave the band eventually and in 1989 he joined Super Fortunes led by Ranjith Perera.

Following a series of unsuccessful business ventures Keerthi and his family left to New Zealand for four years. Following his return, Suresh de Silva requested him to voice a melody he had given him in 1998. And that song was none other than ‘Kandula Ithin Samaweyan’. It became a hit and virtually marked the second innings of Keerthi's musical journey. Keerthi revived his studio ‘Sonic Recording Studio’ with digital state of the art equipment and gave a great service to all artists in the music industry for a very nominal fee. He continued publishing his Sonic diary which listed the contact numbers of all those in the music field. This diary is of immense service to all those in the field even today. He went on many overseas musical tours very often to countries such as USA, Canada, United Kingdom, Italy, France, Japan, Middle East and performed in various musical shows and other events.

Filmography 
With Keerthi's growing popularity, tele drama makers, began requesting Keerthi to star in various small screen creations. Vijaya Dharmasri featured Keerthi opposite Susantha Chandramali and Ranjan Ramanayake in ‘Charulatha’. Sirithunga Perera had Keerthi playing the lead with Achala Alles in Gavven Gavva. Keerthi was cast opposite Vasanthi Chathurani in Bennett Rathnayake's ‘Tharu’. Later in New Zealand, Keerthi acted in ‘Saaraa' scripted and produced by Sumitra Rahubadda – playing with Duleeka Marapone and Ama Wijesekara.

Personal life 
Keerthi married Muditha Fernando in 1978 and had a daughter and son. His eldest daughter, Dinesha Pasquel is now married domiciled in the UK with her husband and son. His son, Kasun Pasquel works for Expolanka Group. Kasun is married to Chethana Ranasinghe who is also blooming in the music industry. In 1994 his first marriage ended and he married Chandana Mudalige in 1995. He has two daughters from Chandana – Charuni Pasquel who is a law graduate and Natalia Pasquel -  a business management graduate. Keerthi feels he is the luckiest father on earth because of the unity and caring attitudes of his four children.

Awards 
In 1996 he received an international award from the World Science Council in Japan, where he competed with musicians from 13 countries.

Orphanage project
Keerthi launched a project called 'The Child' to entertain children from orphanages and to recognize their capabilities. In 2005, 'The Child' collected sponsorship funds that mainly went towards the rehabilitation of the orphaned children from the Boxing Day Tsunami of 2004. This is an ongoing project by Pasquel, organizing not only musical shows, but also dramas, films and amateur talent shows.

Pasquel Sound of Music
Keerthi was the founder of the 'Pasquel Sound of Music' in 2006, a school to teach voice training and instrumental music for those who wish to be professionals in the music industry. At 'Pasquel Sound of Music', established musicians train students to play a musical instrument. Tutors have included Harsha Makalande, Chandrasena Hettiarachchi and Pasquel himself.

During COVID-19 lockdown period, he created fifty new songs since March 2020. He is now ready to release these songs one by one to his own YouTube channel.

See also
 Sri Lankan music
 List of Sri Lankan musicians

References

External links
 Music by Keerthi Pasquel
 Srilankan Music by Keerthi Pasquel

20th-century Sri Lankan male singers
Alumni of Dharmaraja College
Living people
Musicians from Kandy
Sinhalese singers
1956 births